Vanstone is a surname. Notable people with the surname include:

Amanda Vanstone (born 1952), Australian politician and diplomat
Hugh Vanstone, English lighting designer
James W. VanStone (1925–2001), American anthropologist
Paul Vanstone (born 1967), British sculptor
Scott Vanstone (1947-2014), Canadian cryptographer